Wetmore is an unincorporated community and a U.S. Post Office located in Custer County, Colorado, United States.

Description

The Wetmore post office has been in operation since 1881. The community was named after William Wetmore, a first settler. and has the ZIP Code 81253.

Geography
Wetmore is located at  (38.237911,-105.084400).

See also

References

External links

Unincorporated communities in Custer County, Colorado
Unincorporated communities in Colorado